The Indore – Nagda Passenger is a passenger train of Indian Railways, which runs between Indore Junction railway station of Indore, the largest city and commercial hub of Madhya Pradesh and Nagda Junction railway station of Nagda, the important industrial city of Central Indian state Madhya Pradesh

Arrival and departure
Train no.59388 departs from Indore, daily at 08:45 hrs., reaching Nagda the same day at 13.05 hrs.
Train no.59387 departs from Nagda daily at 15:25 hrs. from platform no.2 reaching Indore the same day at 19:30 hrs.

Route and halts
The train goes via Dewas and Ujjain. The important halts of the train are:
 INDORE JUNCTION
 Indore Lakshmibai Nagar
 Indore Sanwer
 Dewas Junction
 Barlai
 Danpura
 Ujjain Vikram Nagar
 Ujjain Junction
 Pahu
 NAGDA JUNCTION

Coach composite
The train consists of 9 Coaches :
 7 Un Reserved
 2 Luggage/Brake Van

Average speed and frequency
The train runs with an average speed of 35 km/h. The train runs on a daily basis.

Loco link
The train is hauled by BRC WAP4/WAM4 engine.

Rake maintenance & sharing
The train is maintained by the Indore Coaching Depot. The same rake is used for Nagda - Ujjain Passenger for one way which is altered by the second rake on the other way.

See also
Avantika Express
Indore Junction
Bhopal Junction

References

Transport in Indore
Railway services introduced in 1999
Rail transport in Madhya Pradesh
Transport in Ujjain
Slow and fast passenger trains in India